Cristian Santana may refer to:
 Cristian Santana (footballer)
 Cristian Santana (baseball)